Old Blue may refer to:

 Old Blue, an alumnus of Christ's Hospital
 Old Blue, an alumnus of the University of California, Berkeley
 Old Blue (song), an old folk song, from which many variations have arisen
 Old Blue (rugby club), a Rugby Super League (US) team based in New York City
 The type of British passport issued before 1993
 Old Blue (black robin), the last remaining fertile female that saved the black robin from extinction
 A conservation award given by Forest and Bird named after the black robin
 A traditional name for Yale University